Rose Hall is a Jamaican Georgian plantation house now run as a historic house museum. It is located in Montego Bay, Jamaica with a panoramic view of the coast. Thought to be one of the country's most impressive plantation great houses, it had fallen into ruins by the 1960s, but was then restored. The museum showcases the slave history of the estate and the legend of the White Witch of Rose Hall.

Description

Rose Hall is widely regarded to be a visually impressive house and the most famous in Jamaica. It is a mansion in Jamaican Georgian style with a stone base and a plastered upper storey, high on the hillside, with a panorama view over the coast. The architect James Hakewill visited the building and wrote:

Rose Hall was restored in the 1960s to its former splendor, with mahogany floors, interior windows and doorways, paneling and wooden ceilings. It is decorated with silk wallpaper printed with palms and birds, ornamented with chandeliers and furnished with mostly European antiques. There is a bar downstairs and a restaurant.

History

The land, 290 acres of caneland, was bought by Henry Fanning for £3,000 in 1742. It was previously called "True Friendship" and had belonged to Richard Lawrence. Henry married Rosa Kelly on July 16, 1746, but died soon afterwards. His widow inherited the estate and married George Ash, a local plantation owner who realised Fanning's plan to build Rose Hall. It cost £30,000 to build and was lavishly decorated with carved mahogany and stone. However Ash died in 1752. Rosa married for a third time, to Norwood Witter in May 1753, who lived until 20 May 1765, managing to consume a significant amount of her fortune. In May 1767 she married John Palmer, a widower who owned the adjoining plantation, "Palmyra".

Rosa died in 1790, leaving her property to her husband. When Palmer died in 1797, he left the property in trust to his two sons John and James Palmer. However, they both died childless, and in 1818 the two estates were passed down to John Rose Palmer, his grandnephew. John Rose Palmer came to Jamaica from England to claim the estate, and on 28 March 1820 he married Anne Mary Patterson from Lucea, Hanover Parish. John Rose Palmer died in November 1827.

Rose Hall estate had about 650 acres divided among sugar cane, grass, and pasture for over 270 head of cattle. About 250 enslaved Africans were housed on Palmyra estate, which comprised about 1,250 acres.

Refurbishment

Rose Hall was bought in 1977 by former Miss USA Michele Rollins and her entrepreneur husband John Rollins. They refurbished it at great personal expense and conceptualised a tour and museum that showcase Rose Hall's slave history, antique splendor and original fittings. Rose Hall also offers night tours that focus on the "Annie Palmer" legend: supposed locations of tunnels, bloodstains, hauntings and murders. Seances are also held on the property in an attempt to conjure Annie's spirit.

Legend

According to legend, a "white witch" called "Annie Palmer" who murdered three husbands haunts the property. An investigation of the legend in 2007 concluded that the story was fictionalized.

See also
 List of plantations in Jamaica
 List of plantation great houses in Jamaica

References

External links
 Aerial view
 Annie Patterson, the white witch of Rose Hall between Reality and Legend
 Official Webpage
 Description and photo of the house as a modern tourist site
 History of the house and modern tourist site

Georgian architecture
Great Houses in Jamaica
Historic house museums in Jamaica
Montego Bay
Buildings and structures in Saint James Parish, Jamaica
Tourist attractions in Saint James Parish, Jamaica